Charlie Dennis (born 28 September 1995) is an English professional footballer who plays as a midfielder for Tampa Bay Rowdies in the USL Championship.

Club career
Dennis signed with USL Championship club Oakland Roots SC on 19 January 2022. On 16 December 2022, Tampa Bay Rowdies signed Dennis from Oakland for an undisclosed fee.

References

External links
 
 Profile at PBA Athletics

1995 births
Living people
English footballers
English expatriate footballers
English expatriate sportspeople in the United States
Association football midfielders
Expatriate soccer players in the United States
Nashville SC (2018–19) players
Palm Beach Atlantic Sailfish men's soccer players
Shorter Hawks men's soccer players
Footballers from Brighton
Tormenta FC players
USL League One players
USL League Two players
Oakland Roots SC players
Tampa Bay Rowdies players